Philochortus spinalis, Peters's shield-backed lizard or Eritrea orangetail lizard, is a species of lizard found from Niger up to Ethiopia, Somalia, and Eritrea.

References

Philochortus
Reptiles described in 1874
Taxa named by Wilhelm Peters